Yuka Kharisma is an Indonesian singer-songwriter based in Kuala Lumpur, Malaysia. 

She was a semi-finalist of the fifth season of Indonesian Idol. In 2016, she won the Best New Female Artist Award of the 15th Anugerah Planet Muzik. In year 2018, Yuka Kharisma launched her first album called YUKA #1 and it is world premiered on her Concert on April 28 along with Bunga Citra Lestari (BCL) and Anuar Zain at Plenary Hall KLCC, Kuala Lumpur, Malaysia.

In 2021, Yuka comeback with a new song called Melihatmu Bahagia, which is composed and song writing by herself.

Personal life
Yuka has been married to her husband Ahmad Jeffny since May 2016.

Discography

Album

Singles

As featured artist

Other songs

References

External Links
 Yuka Kharisma di Instagram

1987 births
Living people
Indonesian Muslims
Acehnese people
Indonesian pop singers
21st-century Indonesian women singers
Indonesian rhythm and blues singers
People from Lhokseumawe
21st-century Malaysian women singers
Malaysian composers